Clifford Virgil Matteson (November 24, 1861 – December 18, 1931) was an American professional baseball player who pitched one game in Major League Baseball for the  St. Louis Maroons.  The game took place on June 13, with Matteson starting the game as pitcher.  He pitched six innings, gave up nine hits, one of which was a home run, and gave up 11 runs, six of which were earned, and he earned the win because the Maroons won the game 16–11.  After the sixth inning, he was moved to center field for the remainder of the game.  Matteson later became the mayor of his hometown of Seville, Ohio where he died at the age of 70 due to acute indigestion, he is interred at Mound Hill Cemetery.

References

External links

1861 births
1931 deaths
Major League Baseball pitchers
St. Louis Maroons players
Augusta Browns players
Baseball players from Ohio
People from Seville, Ohio
19th-century baseball players
Mayors of places in Ohio